Brandmüller is a surname. Notable people with the surname include:

 Gregor Brandmüller (1661–1690), Swiss painter
 Theo Brandmüller (1948–2012), German composer, organist, and teacher
 Walter Brandmüller (born 1929), German Roman Catholic prelate